Campbell Township is the name of two townships in the U.S. state of Indiana:

 Campbell Township, Jennings County, Indiana
 Campbell Township, Warrick County, Indiana

See also
Campbell Township (disambiguation).

Indiana township disambiguation pages